Faye Wong (王菲) is a self-titled album by Chinese singer Faye Wong. Her first recording with EMI, it was recorded in Beijing and released in 1997, around the time that she relocated to Beijing after several years of success in Hong Kong.

All tracks are sung in Mandarin. This album is filled with feelings of lethargy, languor, drowsiness and disengagement, yet most of the songs sound warm and sweet.

The album continued Wong's collaboration with the Cocteau Twins, which began with Random Thoughts in 1994 and Fuzao in 1996. They wrote the fourth track on this album, "Amusement Park", especially for Faye Wong. Track 8 "Reminiscence" (or "Nostalgia") is a cover of "Rilkean Heart" from their 1996 album Milk and Kisses.

Track 5, "Mortal World", was composed by Miyuki Nakajima. Nakajima had also written Wong's 1992 breakthrough song "Fragile Woman".  "Mortal World" was also a hit single and became the closing song with which Wong would end her concerts thereafter. Nakajima re-recorded the song in Japanese as "Streams of Hearts" (Seiryū) on her 1998 album Be Like My Child.

This album has several covers, including a limited edition 3D cover.

The album sold better in Taiwan and mainland China than in Hong Kong, which was hit at that time by the Asian financial crisis, and where Wong's old company Cinepoly released a compilation of her old songs to compete with EMI.

Track listing

References

1997 albums
Faye Wong albums
EMI Records albums
Mandopop albums